Richard Roger Reeves (born September 21, 1959) is a Canadian animated filmmaker. He is known for his whimsical abstract animated films created using a drawn on film technique.

In many of his films, Reeves creates his soundtracks through graphical sound, drawing directly on the optical sound strip area of the film as well as the visual frames to create a sound painting.

Biography
Richard R. Reeves was born in Weymouth, England and has been living in Canada since 1960. He attended Sault College of Applied Arts & Technology, majoring in printmaking.

His early artwork explored painting, printmaking, photography, and music which led him to combine artistic discipline's and animate directly onto the filmstrip as a long and narrow canvas as 'sound painting' or visual music. His début animation 'Linear Dreams' was produced by drawing both the sound and picture directly onto the film.

Reeves worked at Quickdraw Animation Society as Film Production Coordinator for 8 years. He also taught super8 and 16mm filmmaking at the Gulf Islands Film and Television School for 10 years. He has mentored and provided workshops in Europe, South America and across Canada.

Richard explores abstract animation as a visual music by drawing both sound and picture onto film. He has collaborated with artists for live performances involving dancing human projection screens, 16mm violin, interactive animation installations, online animation jams and large outdoor projections. 
He continues exploring film as a space time art form.

Filmography 

 'Story from the Stone'
1991 / 1 min. / 16mm,
inspired by pictographs at Writing on Stone Park, pastel on paper.
 'Major ReBeouf's Lost and Found Film'
1992 / 3 min. / 16mm,
mythological story, created specially for “Return to Exceptional Pass”, Whyte Museum of the Canadian Rockies, Banff.
 'Garbanzo'
1993 / 2 min. / 16mm,
abstract colors and forms to original jazz music, painted directly on to film.
 'Zig Zag'
1994 / 1 min. / 35mm,
zig zag pictures dance to zig zag sounds, etched directly on to one piece of film.
 'Linear Dreams'
1997 / 7 min. 35mm,
images from the minds eye, music from the minds ear, sound and picture drawn on film.
 'Sea Song'
1999 / 4 min. / 35mm,
an animated look into the sparkling ocean at night, sound and picture drawn on film.
 'CFMDC trailer'
1999 / 30 sec. / 35mm,
a trailer for the Canadian Filmmakers Distribution Centre made by 
drawing both sound and picture directly onto motion picture film.
 '1:1'
2001 / 2.5 min. / 35mm,
exploring the one-to-one relationship between sound and picture as visual music.
 'O.I.A.F. Signal Film'
2002 / 24sec. / 35mm,
cameraless animation film introducing the Ottawa International Animation Festival, including a live performance with four 
animators producing optical sound track to film at the National Arts Centre, Ottawa Canada.
 'Element of Light'
2004 / 4.5 min. / 35mm, 
inspired by the elements of nature.
 'Aura'
2006 / 2.5min./ 35mm,
contemplation of aural and visual perceptions,
commissioned work for the Liaison of Independent Filmmakers of Toronto.
 'Yarwood Trail' 
2009 / 4 min. / 35mm,
inspired by the artwork of Walter Yarwood, sound and picture drawn onto film.
commissioned work for the Toronto Animated Image Society commemorating the Painters 11.
‘Once Upon a Mountain’
2014 / 3min / 16mm,
based on true story of mountain climbing in the Canadian Rockies. animated watercolour paintings.
'Twilight'
2018 / 2 min. / 35mm, handmade optical sounds and drawing onto film.
inspired by the two lights (twi-light) found inside of film projectors.
'TV'
2018 / 2 min. / 35mm, handmade optical sounds and drawing onto film.
transformational vibrations: Inspirational mark making as a visual representation of handmade optical sounds.
'Four Elements of Change' 
2019 / 5.5min. / 16mm cameraless and 16mm black+white hand processed film, 
Four short films inspired by theme of climate change created for 'Shifting Ground', group exhibition at Langham Cultural Centre, Kaslo BC, Canada.
'Wood and Metal Bars'
2021 / 10 min./ 16mm cameraless.
a meditative journey through colour, form and sound. Music video created for chamber music composer Frank Horvat, performed by percussionist Beverly Johnston.
'Hot Flashes' 
2022 / 16mm silent film / 1 min. / cameraless.
a silent flicker film with pulsating frames of red, pink and orange.
'Intersextion'
2022 / 4min. / 35mm, handmade optical sounds and drawing onto film.
two abstract energies fall in love, unite as one then disappear into a vanishing point.
'Fusion'
2023 / 3:20 / 35mm, handmade optical sounds and drawing onto film.
work in progress...

Collections
Collections of Film Prints :
National Library and Archives of Canada, Ottawa.
Academy of Motion Picture Arts and Science Film Archive, Hollywood, USA.
National Film Board of Canada, Montreal. 
IOTA Centre for Visual Music, Los Angeles, USA.
Canadian Filmmakers Distribution Centre. 
Cinematheque Quebecois, Montreal, Canada.
Newfoundland Filmmakers Coop, Canada.

Awards
2023 - Jury Choice Award, Experimental Film : Thomas Edison Film Festival, USA.
2019 - Jury Stellar Award:Best Experimental Film : Black Maria Film Festival, USA.
2018 - Best Non Narrative Animation : GIRAF festival, Canada
2005 – Directors Choice Award : Black Maria Film Festival
2003 – Jury Citation Award : Black Maria Film Festival, USA
2001 – Award of Merit : Oberhausen Short Film Festival, Germany
2000 – Directors Choice Award : Black Maria Film Festival, USA
1998 – Best Canadian Animated Film : Ottawa International Animation Festival
1998 – Best Abstract Film : Zagreb International Animation Film Festival, Croatia
1998 – Jury Award : Brisbane International Animation Festival, Australia
1998 – Juror's Choice Award : Black Maria Film Festival, USA
1998 – Best Sound Design : Ann Arbor Experimental Film Festival, USA
1998 – Award of the Academy of Fine Art : University of Zagreb, Croatia
1998 – Award of the Artiria Gallery : Zagreb, Croatia
1998 – Award of Merit : San Francisco International film Festival
1998 – 2nd Prize Experimental Film : World Animation Celebration, USA
1997 – Best Canadian Short Film : Atlantic Film Festival
1997 – Best Experimental Film : Sea to Sky Film Festival, Canada
1997 – Best Animated Film : Victoria Independent Film Festival
1997 – Best Animated Film : Alberta Motion Picture Industry Awards

References

Sources 
 Drawing for Animation : Paul Wells : Basics Animation 03, UK.
 The Animation Bible : Maureen Furniss : 2008 : .  pg.164-165, pg.176-179.
 Animania: 100 anni di esperimenti nel cinema di animazione. DiMarino, Bruno Author, Pesaro Italy.
 Take One Magazine : Experimental Film / summer 1999; Goslawski, Barbara critical review and interview.
 Animation as Music : pg.98 / 1999; Kreutz, Rune Animation Historian and Instructor, critical review, Hogskulen i Volda Norway.
 Frames per Second Magazine : issue 14 pg.29/ 1998 ; Robinson, Chris Artistic Director for the Ottawa International Animation Festival, critical review.
 The Film Strip Tells All: (Animation World Network) ; Dr. William Moritz, Animation Historian and Cal Arts Experimental Animation Instructor, https://www.awn.com/mag/issue3.6/3.6pages/3.6moritzfilms.html
 Recipes for Disaster : Helen Hill, http://www.filmlabs.org/docs/recipes_for_disaster_hill.pdf

External links
 Personal website
 http://www.awn.com/mag/issue3.6/3.6pages/3.6moritzfilms.html
 https://books.google.com/books?id=gncWAQAAIAAJ
 http://www.filmlabs.org/docs/recipes_for_disaster_hill.pdf

Abstract animation
Living people
Canadian animated film directors
People from Weymouth, Dorset
English emigrants to Canada
1959 births
Graphical sound
Drawn-on-film animators